Acianthus fornicatus, commonly known as bristly mosquito orchid or pixie caps, is a species of flowering plant in the orchid family Orchidaceae and is endemic to eastern Australia. It is a terrestrial herb with a single, heart-shaped leaf and up to ten translucent pinkish-red flowers, and is widespread and common in coastal and near-coastal areas.

Description
Acianthus fornicatus is a terrestrial, perennial, deciduous, sympodial herb with a single heart-shaped, glabrous, dark green leaf which is reddish-purple on its lower surface.

The labellum is green, rarely blackish, egg-shaped to lance-shaped,  with the outer edges turned under. There is a thick, fleshy callus covering most of the central area and many small pimple-like papillae on the outer half. Flowering occurs between May and August.

This species is distinguished from others in the genus by its largish, projecting flowers, usually pinkish colouring, and broad dorsal sepal and labellum.

Taxonomy and naming
Acianthus fornicatus was first formally described by Robert Brown in 1810 and the description was published in Prodromus florae Novae Hollandiae. The specific epithet (fornicatus) is a Latin word meaning "vaulted" or "arched".

Distribution and habitat
This mosquito orchid is widespread and common in coastal and near-coastal areas in heathy forest and coastal scrub, growing in well-drained sandy loam. It occurs in Queensland and in New South Wales as far south as Eden.

Conservation
Acianthus fornicatus is not threatened in New South Wales, but is classified as threatened in Victoria, where it is found only on Gabo Island.

References

External links 
 

fornicatus
Orchids of New South Wales
Orchids of Queensland
Endemic orchids of Australia
Plants described in 1810
Taxa named by Robert Brown (botanist, born 1773)